Sunset Bay State Park is a state park in the U.S. state of Oregon. The park offers a crescent shaped beach, tide pools, hiking trails and a year-round campground.

The park is one of three along the Cape Arago Highway, which runs along the Pacific Ocean west of U.S. Route 101. A hiking trail links Sunset Bay to Shore Acres.

Land for the park was acquired in stages through 1984. Coos County donated the original tract to the state in 1948. In 1954, Ralph Barker donated a parcel with a water supply. The Bureau of Land Management later added tracts through a grant to the state, which also bought, exchanged, or otherwise acquired land from private owners.

Sunset Bay is home to one of Oregon's ghost forests, created by an earthquake on the Cascadia subduction zone that dropped the shoreline about 1,200 years ago. The shoreline contains stumps of drowned spruce trees.

Climate
Located on the Oregon Coast, Sunset Bay State Park has a mild oceanic climate (Cfb), with minimal temperature variation throughout the year. Summers are dry, but still cool, partly-to-mostly cloudy and foggy. Temperatures below  or above  are uncommon, while snowfall is fairly rare.

See also
 List of Oregon state parks

References

External links 
 http://www.yelp.com/biz/sunset-bay-state-park-charleston

Parks in Coos County, Oregon
State parks of Oregon